Bandiougou Fadiga (born 15 January 2001) is a French professional footballer who plays as a midfielder for Super League Greece club Ionikos, on loan from Olympiacos.

Career

Paris Saint-Germain 
An academy graduate of Paris Saint-Germain (PSG), Fadiga signed his first professional contract on 29 January 2019. He made his professional debut on 16 September 2020 in a 1–0 Ligue 1 win against Metz. "I feel a lot of pride, it was difficult to come on in such a match. I cannot ask for more than a win at the Parc for my first game," he said to PSG TV after the match. Fadiga would go on to make five more appearances in the first half of the 2020–21 season for PSG.

Loan to Brest 
On 1 February 2021, Fadiga joined Ligue 1 side Brest on loan until the end of the season, with the deal containing a purchase option. He made his debut for the club in a 2–1 Coupe de France win over Rodez on 10 February. On 6 March, Fadiga started in a 3–0 home Coupe de France defeat to his parent club PSG. At the 9th minute of the match, he was punished by Marco Verratti, who stole the ball from him and provided the assist for Kylian Mbappé's opening goal. In the second half of the match, Fadiga tested PSG goalkeeper Sergio Rico with several attempts, but did not manage to score. At the end of the season, Fadiga returned to the capital from his loan in Brittany.

Olympiacos 
On 14 January 2022, Fadiga signed for Super League Greece side Olympiacos on a contract until 2026. He made his debut as a substitute in a 3–1 league win over Panetolikos on 2 February. One week later, he made his first start for Olympiacos in a 3–1 Greek Cup quarter-final win over the same opponents. At the third minute of the match, Fadiga fired a ball onto the crossbar; he scored three minutes later after stealing the ball from opponent Johan Mårtensson and receiving an assist from João Carvalho. In his first season with Olympiacos, Fadiga won the league title.

Personal life
Born in France, Fadiga is of Malian descent.

Career statistics

Honours
Olympiacos
Super League Greece: 2021–22

References

External links
 
 

2001 births
Living people
Footballers from Paris
French footballers
French people of Malian descent
Association football midfielders
Championnat National 2 players
Ligue 1 players
Super League Greece players
Super League Greece 2 players
Paris Saint-Germain F.C. players
Stade Brestois 29 players
Olympiacos F.C. players
Olympiacos F.C. B players
Ionikos F.C. players
Black French sportspeople
French expatriate footballers
Expatriate footballers in Greece
French expatriate sportspeople in Greece